The BFG (titled onscreen as Roald Dahl's The BFG) is a 2016 fantasy adventure film directed and co-produced by Steven Spielberg, written by Melissa Mathison (her final film before her 2015 death) and based on Roald Dahl's 1982 novel of the same name. The film stars Mark Rylance, Ruby Barnhill in her film debut, Penelope Wilton, Jemaine Clement, Rebecca Hall, Rafe Spall and Bill Hader. In the film, a 10-year-old orphaned girl named Sophie befriends a benevolent giant dubbed the "Big Friendly Giant", who takes her to Giant Country, where they attempt to stop the man-eating giants that are invading the human world.

Kathleen Kennedy and Frank Marshall began development on a live-action adaptation of The BFG back in the 1990s, and various screenwriters were hired to work on the screenplay in the subsequent years. DreamWorks acquired the screen rights to Dahl's book in September 2011, and Marshall and Sam Mercer joined as producers, Mathison as screenwriter and Kennedy as executive producer. Spielberg was announced as director in April 2014, alongside his production company Amblin Entertainment as co-producer. Principal photography commenced in March 2015, marking Spielberg's first directorial film for Walt Disney Pictures, which co-financed the film.

The BFG premiered at the Cannes Film Festival on May 14, 2016, and held its North American debut at the El Capitan Theater on June 21, 2016. The film was released in the United States in Disney Digital 3D, RealD 3D, IMAX 3D, and conventional theatrical formats on July 1, 2016, the same year of Dahl's centennial. Despite receiving generally positive reviews from critics, the film was a box office bomb, grossing $195 million against its $140 million budget.

Plot

Sophie, a 10-year-old girl living in a London orphanage, is often awake at the "witching hour". One night, she shouts at some men in an alley-way. Later, she sees an elderly Giant Man outside her window, who captures her and takes her to his home in Giant Country. He explains that he cannot allow Sophie to return to her world and reveal the existence of giants. If she ventures out alone, she may be eaten by the nine much larger giants.

In his workshop of dreams, the giant fashions a nightmare to convince the sleeping Sophie to stay with him in safety. The Fleshlumpeater, the infantile leader of the man-eating giants, intrudes and demands for a "boo-boo" on his finger to be fixed. He smells Sophie, but the elderly giant convinces him to leave. Sophie persuades the friendly giant to take her to visit Dream Country. They accidentally awaken the other giants, and after the Bloodbottler suggests they "frolic", they bully the friendly giant. A thunderstorm drives the man-eating giants into their cave, but the Fleshlumpeater finds Sophie's dropped blanket.

In Dream Country, Sophie and the friendly giant catch good and bad dreams. The giant reveals that his only name – besides "Runt", the other giants' nickname for him – is "the Big Friendly Giant", which leads Sophie to call him "BFG". She accompanies him to London for his nightly work: using his dream-trumpet to spread good dreams to sleeping children. They return to Giant Country just as the other giants have finished eating children around the world. The BFG realizes that Sophie has lost her blanket, exposing her presence to the other giants, and leaves her outside her orphanage. Explaining that his last human companion liked to read, and even taught The BFG how to read, but sadly The Boy was discovered and eaten by the giants, he is unwilling to endanger Sophie and departs. Unafraid, Sophie jumps off her balcony in the hope he will appear again to catch her, and he does.

They return to the BFG's workshop and the other giants barge in, hunting for Sophie. They destroy much of the BFG's work, but Sophie evades detection and the BFG drives them off with a hot iron. Sophie finds the home of the last human to live with the BFG, with a portrait of Queen Victoria among his belongings. This inspires her to devise a plan: to forge a nightmare for Elizabeth II, the Queen of the United Kingdom, about giants eating the children of England, the British Army fighting the giants, and Sophie appearing to her.

Sophie and the BFG go to Buckingham Palace and deliver the nightmare to the sleeping Queen. Upon waking, the Queen and members of her staff Mary and Mr. Tibbs find Sophie on the windowsill. She introduces them to the BFG, explaining that the child-eating giants are real and must be stopped. At a large breakfast, the BFG shares his favorite drink, flatulence-inducing "frobscottle", and he and Sophie lead the Queen's soldiers to Giant Country.

The BFG plans to ambush the man-eating giants with a nightmare, but has forgotten his dream-trumpet. Sophie carries the nightmare herself into the midst of the giants, and is confronted by the Fleshlumpeater. She releases the nightmare which consumes the giants with guilt, except the unregretful Fleshlumpeater (who intercepts and destroys his), and they are ensnared by military helicopters. Carried away to an isolated island, the giants are left with only "snozzcumbers", a disgusting vegetable, to plant and eat, much to their despair.

Sophie gets adopted by Mary and comes to live in the Queen's palace, and awakens from a dream of the BFG, who returns to his life at Giant Country and writes the story of their adventure. She speaks to him whenever she feels lonely; at his home, the BFG hears her words and smiles.

Cast
 Mark Rylance as the Big Friendly Giant (BFG), an elderly, benevolent 24-foot giant. He is called "Runt" by the other giants.
 Ruby Barnhill as Sophie, an orphan who befriends The BFG. Dahl named her after his own mother, who was similarly caring and determined.
 Penelope Wilton as Queen Elizabeth II, the Queen of the United Kingdom.
 Jemaine Clement as The Fleshlumpeater, an aquaphobic 54-foot giant who is the de facto leader of the man-eating giants. He shows no regret for consuming children over the years. 
 Rebecca Hall as Mary, Queen Elizabeth's maid and Sophie's mother.
 Rafe Spall as Mr. Tibbs, Queen Elizabeth's butler.
 Bill Hader as the Bloodbottler, a disheveled 43-foot man-eating giant with cowlick hair who is Fleshlumpeater's advisor and the most intelligent of the group.
 Michael Adamthwaite as the Butcher Boy, an overweight, immature man-eating giant who is the youngest of the group. He collects cars and wears clothes made of circus tents.
 Daniel Bacon as the Bonecruncher, a dark-skinned, bald-headed man-eating giant. As the name suggests, he loves to crunch on the bones of his victims like candy. It's said he can be heard crunching bones for miles. 
 Chris Gibbs as the Gizzardgulper, a burly, bearded 39-foot man-eating giant who wears a helmet and is the shortest of the group.
 Adam Godley as the Manhugger, a very tall and slim man-eating giant who wears a vest and shorts. He seems to be the laziest of them all. 
 Paul Moniz de Sa as the Meatdripper, a well-groomed man-eating giant with Mohawk hair. He also is the most serious about hunting in the group, clearly more determined than the rest to find Sophie. he doesn't wear a shirt, and has red shorts. 
 Jonathan Holmes as the Childchewer, a balding man-eating giant who is Meatdripper's best friend. He obviously enjoys human child the most out of the giants, and eats only children. 
 Ólafur Darri Ólafsson as the Maidmasher, a small-headed man-eating giant. He has short thin hair, and as the name suggests, likes to smash maidens. Either with his teeth, hands or feet. It is never expanded on. 
 Marilyn Norry as Mrs. Clonkers, the head of the orphanage where Sophie was living.
 Chris Shields, Matt Frewer, and Geoffrey Wade as The Queen's Generals

Adamthwaite, Bacon, Gibbs, Godley, Holmes, Moniz de Sa, and Ólafsson also make cameos as minor London characters. William Samples and Ruby Barnhill's father, Paul Barnhill, make cameos as the palace staff members.

Production

Development
Producers Frank Marshall and Kathleen Kennedy began development on a live-action adaptation of The BFG in 1991, and set the project up at Paramount Pictures. Husband and wife screenwriters Robin Swicord and Nicholas Kazan wrote a screenplay adaptation in 1998, with Robin Williams in negotiations for the title role. Williams attended a read-through, which according to Michael Siegel was "surprisingly disappointing". Williams' trademark improvisational style clashed with the BFG's unique language. Siegel elaborates, "He was sort of improvising on the jumbled language. And it was clunky. It was strangely not working. It was harder than it looks even for Robin. It didn't quite deliver." By 2001, the script had been rewritten by Gwyn Lurie, and was greeted with positive feedback from the Dahl estate. Terry Jones and Ed Solomon also attempted screenplay drafts. While the screenplay lingered in development hell, Paramount subsequently lost the film rights and they reverted to the Dahl estate.

In September 2011, DreamWorks acquired the film rights to the book; Kennedy and Marshall were announced to produce, with screenwriter Melissa Mathison adapting the story. Initially, John Madden was hired to direct; however, in April 2014, Steven Spielberg was announced as the director, with Madden now listed as executive producer with producer Michael Siegel. Kennedy had initially thought of Spielberg as director, but hesitated asking him until a more concrete screenplay was presentable. Spielberg stated, "The BFG has enchanted families and their children for more than three decades. We are honoured that the Roald Dahl estate has entrusted us with this classic story." Walden Media agreed to co-produce and co-finance the film with DreamWorks and Amblin Entertainment in March 2015. A month later, Walt Disney Studios—which was under prior agreement to distribute the film through its Touchstone Pictures banner—also joined the production as a co-producer and co-financier, and shifted the film from a Touchstone release to a Walt Disney Pictures production instead. Consequently, The BFG is the first Disney-branded film directed by Spielberg, though he has previously produced several films for the studio. Similarly, as a result of Amblin Partners' restructuring, DreamWorks did not receive a marquee credit—placement of the studio's production logo on marketing materials and opening titles—and instead, DreamWorks' marquee credit shifted to Amblin. The film is the second adaptation of the novel following the 1989 direct-to-television animated film. It is also Disney's first feature-length adaptation of a Roald Dahl work since 1996, Henry Selick's James and the Giant Peach.

Casting
Mark Rylance was cast as the BFG in October 2014. Spielberg had approached Rylance with the role during the filming of Bridge of Spies. Spielberg was quoted as saying that "Mark Rylance is a transformational actor. I am excited and thrilled that Mark will be making this journey with us to Giant Country. Everything about his career so far is about making the courageous choice and I'm honoured he has chosen The BFG as his next big screen performance." Rylance performed the character through motion capture, a process which he referred to as "liberating". In mid-November 2014, it was revealed that a ten-year-old student of Lower Peover School, Ruby Barnhill, had auditioned for the film. She had to learn six pages of dialogue in preparation for a possible role as the orphan Sophie. After a lengthy search, on December 16, Barnhill was cast in the role, about which she said, "I feel incredibly lucky and I'm so happy." Spielberg stated that they "have discovered a wonderful Sophie in Ruby Barnhill." Bill Hader was set to star in the film in an unspecified role on March 27, 2015. On April 13, 2015, the rest of the cast was announced, which included Penelope Wilton, Rebecca Hall, Jemaine Clement, Michael David Adamthwaite, Daniel Bacon, Chris Gibbs, Adam Godley, Jonathan Holmes, Paul Moniz de Sa, and Ólafur Ólafsson.

Filming
Principal photography on the film began on March 23, 2015, in Vancouver and concluded on June 12, 2015. Weta Digital worked on the film's visual effects. It is Mathison's final film following her death on November 4, 2015.

Music

John Williams composed and conducted the film's musical score, marking the twenty-seventh collaboration between Spielberg and Williams. Williams was announced as the film's composer in March 2015. During the process of writing the score, Williams compared the film to "a child's ballet where there are dances involved," elaborating, "The BFG tries to capture dreams with his net and does something that almost looks like a Ray Bolger or Fred Astaire dance; it is an amazingly musical and choreographic sequence which required the orchestra to do things that are more associated with musical films." Williams found similarities with the scoring of Home Alone, admitting that writing music for The BFG "was really an opportunity to compose and orchestrate a little children's fantasy for orchestra." The soundtrack was released by Walt Disney Records on July 1, 2016.

Release

The BFG premiered on May 14, 2016, at the 2016 Cannes Film Festival, in an out of competition screening. Walt Disney Studios Motion Pictures distributed the film worldwide, except for territories in Europe, Africa and the Middle East, where the film's distribution rights were sold by Amblin's international partner, Mister Smith Entertainment, to independent distributors.

Disney released a teaser trailer on December 9, 2015. A second trailer was released on April 5, 2016. A third trailer was released on May 16, 2016. The film held its North American premiere at the El Capitan Theatre in Hollywood, California on June 21, 2016. It was released in the United States on July 1, 2016. Entertainment One distributed the film in the U.K. on July 22, 2016. DreamWorks' financial partner, Reliance Entertainment, released the film in India on July 29, 2016. Huaxia Film Distribution released the film in China.

Walt Disney Studios Home Entertainment released The BFG on Blu-ray, DVD, and digital download on November 29, 2016. The film debuted in third of the home media sales chart for the week ending on December 2, 2016. Entertainment One and 20th Century Fox Home Entertainment released the UK edition on DVD in 2016.

Reception

Box office
The BFG grossed $55.5 million in North America and $139.7 million in other territories for a worldwide total of $195.2 million, against a production budget of $140 million.

In the United States and Canada, The BFG opened alongside The Legend of Tarzan and The Purge: Election Year at 3,357 theaters, and was projected to gross $22–32 million in its opening weekend. The film was notably vying for drawing family audiences with the studio's own Finding Dory. It made $775,000 from its Thursday previews; however, the low figure was not surprising, given how family films tend to attract fewer audiences during late-night showings. This was followed by a $7 million opening day (including previews) and a disappointing $18.6 million opening weekend, which Deadline Hollywood called "an awful start for this film which is estimated to cost $140 million". Forbes noted that Steven Spielberg's films tend to have long runs, irrespective of their opening numbers. However, it also pointed out that the July 4th weekend proves to be a non-leggy release schedule and most films released during this time end up making only twice their holiday total over the course of their domestic theatrical run. The New York Times called the opening figures "a colossal misfire".

Due to the film's poor performance in North America, the film was considered a box office disappointment.
As a result of its low opening numbers in North America, the film needed greater financial success in its international markets, as pointed out by David Hollis, Disney's distribution chief, saying, "we're going to be reliant in a lot of ways on international [audiences]". Internationally—during its opening weekend—where the 4th of July weekend is not a holiday, the film opened to $3.9 million in its opening weekend from two markets, Australia and Russia. In Australia, it opened to $2 million placing third while in Russia it debuted second with $1.9 million, which tops the entire runs of Charlie and the Chocolate Factory and War Horse. In the United Kingdom, where the book is more well known, it opened to $6.9 million.

In China, the release was handled by Huaxia Film Distribution. While it benefitted from a robust marketing effort including Spielberg's presence in the country itself, it suffered from a three month long delay after its North American release. It had an estimated $13.8 million opening, debuting at second place behind Operation Mekong. Many Chinese online reviews criticized Spielberg for making the film "too juvenile" for adults.

The BFG is one of the lowest-grossing films of Spielberg's career, specifically in North America and, when accounting for inflation, one of the year's biggest flops, but The Hollywood Reporter noted that Disney would be able to withstand the losses due to the success of Captain America: Civil War and Finding Dory. The site also highlighted that the financial losses for Disney could be $90–100 million based on theatrical returns alone.

Critical response
On the review aggregator Rotten Tomatoes, the film has an approval rating of 74% based on 301 reviews and an average rating of 6.70/10. The site's critical consensus reads, "The BFG minimizes the darker elements of Roald Dahl's classic in favor of a resolutely good-natured, visually stunning, and largely successful family-friendly adventure." On another aggregator, Metacritic, the film has a score of 66 out of 100 based on 47 critics, indicating "generally favorable reviews". Audiences polled by CinemaScore gave the film an average grade of "A−" on an A+ to F scale.

Justin Chang of Los Angeles Times called Rylance's performance a "brilliant amalgam of performance-capture technology and peerless screen presence." Scott Mendelson of Forbes described the film as "a charming, intelligent, and witty little adventure movie with strong special effects work in the service of a most unassuming story." Mendelson also commended the film's smaller scope in story, as well as Rylance and Barnhill's interaction. Robbie Collin of The Daily Telegraph called the film "a significant technical accomplishment", adding that "the infinitesimally detailed motion-capture technology alone, which stretches Rylance’s human performance to gargantuan proportions, is river-straddling bounds beyond anything that’s come before it." Critic Matt Zoller Seitz highly appreciated Spielberg's direction of the film, giving the film three and a half out of four stars. Seitz remarks, "I can imagine some adults finding the movie dull; 'Nothing happens', they'll say. 'And it's too nice.' But I can imagine other adults loving the film for helping them remember what it's like to be young enough to hide from a movie monster because he's big and weird-looking and then laugh because he's kind of silly..."

Todd McCarthy of The Hollywood Reporter compared the film objectively to Spielberg's E.T. the Extra-Terrestrial, as a "conspicuously less captivating, magical and transporting experience than its classic forebear." Peter Debruge of Variety, however, compared the film favorably to E.T., writing, "this splendid Steven Spielberg-directed adaptation makes it possible for audiences of all ages to wrap their heads around one of the unlikeliest friendships in cinema history, resulting in the sort of instant family classic “human beans” once relied upon Disney to deliver." A. O. Scott of The New York Times praised the film's digital effects and visual style as "exquisite", though he felt that the film lacked the excitement found in Spielberg's previous fantasy films.

Richard Brody of The New Yorker stating that it "plays like a forced march of fun, a mandatory strain of magic and a prescribed dose of poetry, like a movie ready-made for screening in classrooms when a teacher is absent." Brody, however, observes that "Spielberg is the BFG who's menaced by bigger and more monstrous giants who aren't interested in edifying their audiences but merely in consuming them—consuming the consumer, so to speak." Richard Roeper of the Chicago Sun-Times called the film "technically impressive but listless and tedious... painfully cutesy, silly and gross rather than whimsical and funny." He thought that the film moved far too slowly and was missing a "sense of wonder and adventure", saying that he'd "rather see every one of Spielberg's previous films before having to sit through The BFG again".

Accolades

See also 

 The BFG, the 1989 British animated feature

References

External links

 
 
 
 
 
 

2016 films
2016 3D films
2010s fantasy adventure films
2010s children's adventure films
2010s children's fantasy films
2010s monster movies
American 3D films
American children's adventure films
American fantasy adventure films
British 3D films
British children's adventure films
British fantasy adventure films
Films based on British novels
Films based on children's books
Films based on fantasy novels
Films based on works by Roald Dahl
Films set in 1982
Films set in a fictional country
Films set in London
Films set in palaces
Films shot in Vancouver
Films about dreams
Films about friendship
Films about giants
Films about orphans
IMAX films
Cultural depictions of Elizabeth II
Films scored by John Williams
Films directed by Steven Spielberg
Films produced by Frank Marshall
Films produced by Sam Mercer
Films produced by Steven Spielberg
High fantasy films
Films with live action and animation
Films using motion capture
Films with screenplays by Melissa Mathison
Amblin Entertainment films
Entertainment One films
Reliance Entertainment films
The Kennedy/Marshall Company films
Walden Media films
Walt Disney Pictures films
Constantin Film films
Nordisk Film films
2010s English-language films
2010s American films
2010s British films